Afaha Iman is a village in the Etinan local government area of Akwa Ibom State, Nigeria.

References 

Villages in Akwa Ibom